Dasht-e Mowrd-e Ghurak (also Romanized as Dasht-e Mowrd-e Ghūrak; also known as Dasht-e Mowrd) is a village in Babuyi Rural District, Basht District, Basht County, Kohgiluyeh and Boyer-Ahmad Province, Iran. At the 2006 census, its population was 81, in 15 families.

References 

Populated places in Basht County